Englewood Township may refer to the following townships in the United States:

 Englewood Township, Clark County, Kansas
 Englewood Township, New Jersey, in Bergen County